Leslie Arthur Waghorn (29 July 1906 – 22 August 1979) was an English cricketer.  Waghorn was a left-handed batsman who bowled slow left-arm orthodox.  He was born at Robertsbridge, Sussex.

Waghorn made his first-class debut for Sussex against Nottinghamshire at Trent Bridge in the 1926 County Championship.  He made three further first-class appearances for the county, the last of which came against the touring New Zealanders in 1927.  In his four first-class matches for Sussex, Waghorn took 3 wickets at an average of 59.66, with best figures of 2/34.  With the bat, he scored just 14 runs at a batting average of 2.33, with a high score of 7.  In 1928, he made his final first-class appearance for the Marylebone Cricket Club against Derbyshire at Lord's.  In Derbyshire's first-innings of 353, he went wicketless from his fourteen overs.  In the Marylebone Cricket Club's first-innings of 355, Waghorn was dismissed for a duck by Leslie Townsend.  He did take a sole wicket in Derbyshire's second-innings, that of Jim Hutchinson, while in the Marylebone Cricket Club's second-innings he wasn't required to bat, with the match ending in a victory by 7 wickets for the Marylebone Cricket Club.

He died at the village of his birth on 22 August 1979.

References

External links
Leslie Waghorn at ESPNcricinfo
Leslie Waghorn at CricketArchive

1906 births
1979 deaths
People from Robertsbridge
English cricketers
Sussex cricketers
Marylebone Cricket Club cricketers